Shehu Mohammed Shagari (born 29 November 1990 in Kano) is a Nigerian footballer who is currently playing in the Nigerian Premier League for Kano Pillars F.C.

Career 
Shehu began 2004 his career with the second team of  Kano Pillars F.C. The left Midfielder was promoted to the first team in 2008.

International career 
Shagari is member of the 2009 FIFA U-20 World Cup squad. He was a reserve player in the first game on 25 September against Venezuela and was with the team in the August 2009 Training Camp in Spain.

References 

Living people
1990 births
Association football defenders
Nigerian footballers
Nigeria under-20 international footballers
Kano Pillars F.C. players
Sportspeople from Kano